Eugene McGee (16 November 1941 – 5 May 2019) was an Irish Gaelic footballer, manager, trainer, selector, Gaelic games administrator and journalist, who is best known for his time as manager of the Offaly senior football team. McGee guided the Offaly team to success in the 1980, 1981, and 1982 Leinster Senior Football Championship, and to the 1982 All-Ireland Senior Football Championship title.

McGee was in charge of Ireland when they toured Australia for the 1990 International Rules Series. He was also in charge for the 1987 International Rules Series and Seán McCague was his assistant manager on both occasions.

In 2004, McGee was intermediary in a dispute between Offaly's International Rules Series player Ciaran McManus and the Offaly County Board when McManus questioned the selection of a new manager.

McGee chaired the Football Review Committee (FRC) during Liam O'Neill's GAA presidency that led to adjustments to the game such as the introduction of a black card.

He wrote for the Longford Leader, The Irish Press, The Sunday Press, Sunday Tribune and Irish Independent.

Seán Lowry described him as "a stern man".

McGee was interviewed for the documentary Players of the Faithful, which RTÉ One showed less than six months before his death.

Honours
University College Dublin
All-Ireland Senior Club Football Championship (2): 1974, 1975
Leinster Senior Club Football Championship (2): 1973, 1974
Dublin Senior Football Championship (2): 1973, 1974
Sigerson Cup (7): 1968, 1973, 1974, 1975, 1977, 1978, 1979

Newtowncashel
Longford Senior Football Championship (1): 1977

Offaly
All-Ireland Senior Football Championship (1): 1982
Leinster Senior Football Championship (3): 1980, 1981, 1982
Leinster Under-21 Football Championship (2): 1977, 1979

Cavan
Dr McKenna Cup (1): 1988

References

1941 births
2019 deaths
Gaelic football managers
Gaelic football selectors
Gaelic games administrators
Gaelic games writers and broadcasters
Ireland international rules football team
Irish Independent people
Sunday Tribune people
The Irish Press people
The Sunday Press people